Gregory Bernard Johnston (born February 12, 1955) is a former Major League Baseball outfielder.

Johnston grew up in Azusa, California and played baseball at Gladstone High in Covina, California. His nickname was "Scar" due to a big scar on the left side of his face that he got from an accident when he was a child - he was hit by a garbage truck. At Gladstone Johnston played alongside Jack Clark, where he was considered just as good if not a better player at the time. After Gladstone, Johnston went to play baseball for Citrus College before joining the minor leagues.

External links
, or Retrosheet, or Pura Pelota

1955 births
Living people
American expatriate baseball players in Japan
Baseball players from Los Angeles
Citrus Owls baseball players
Fresno Giants players
Hanshin Tigers players
Major League Baseball outfielders
Minnesota Twins players
Phoenix Giants players
San Francisco Giants players
Tigres de Aragua players
American expatriate baseball players in Venezuela
Toledo Mud Hens players
Waterbury Giants players